Colley is a masculine given name. Notable people with the name include:

Colley Cibber (1671–1757), English actor-manager
Colley Harman Scotland (1818–1903), first Chief Justice of the Madras High Court in India

See also
Collie (name) 

Masculine given names